Kamel Ouejdide  (born 1 May 1980) is a French-Moroccan former professional footballer who played as a striker.

Career statistics

References

External links
 
 
 

1980 births
Living people
Footballers from Rabat
Association football forwards
Moroccan footballers
Ligue 2 players
Championnat National players
Süper Lig players
Challenger Pro League players
Stade Malherbe Caen players
Red Star F.C. players
Göztepe S.K. footballers
Fortuna Düsseldorf players
ASOA Valence players
FC Sète 34 players
Clermont Foot players
AS Cannes players
Racing de Ferrol footballers
R.F.C. Seraing (1922) players
RWS Bruxelles players
Moroccan expatriate footballers
Moroccan expatriate sportspeople in Belgium
Expatriate footballers in Belgium
Moroccan expatriate sportspeople in Germany
Expatriate footballers in Germany
Moroccan expatriate sportspeople in Turkey
Expatriate footballers in Turkey
Francs Borains players